The Samen Al-Aeme Stadium, commonly known as Samen, is a multi-use stadium in Mashhad, Razavi Khorasan, Iran, with a 27,000 seating capacity. The stadium was opened in 2004 with a 35,000 capacity and is owned by the Ministry of Sport and Youth. It is the home stadium of Aboomoslem and the former home venue of Payam and Padideh and Siah Jamegan.

References

Football venues in Iran
Buildings and structures in Mashhad
Sport in Razavi Khorasan Province